Angelika Brunkhorst (née Huber; born 9 October 1955, in Hanover) is a German politician and member of the FDP.

A member of the FDP since 1995, on 21 March 2003 she replaced the retiring Christian Eberl in the Bundestag, the German federal parliament. There, she served as FDP spokesperson on renewable energy until 2005. At the 2009 German federal election, she stood unsuccessfully in the Delmenhorst – Wesermarsch – Oldenburg-Land district.

External links 
  
 Biography by German Bundestag 

1955 births
Living people
Politicians from Hanover
University of Oldenburg alumni
Members of the Bundestag for Lower Saxony
German Lutherans
21st-century German women politicians
Members of the Bundestag 2009–2013
Members of the Bundestag 2005–2009
Members of the Bundestag 2002–2005
Members of the Bundestag for the Free Democratic Party (Germany)